Coton Sport Football Club de Garoua, or simply Coton Sport, is a Cameroonian football club based in Garoua. They play their home games at the Stade Omnisport de Garoua, commonly known as the Roumde Adjia Stadium. The club is chaired by Sadou Fernand. The first team plays in MTN Elite One (Cameroonian first division) (since 1993) and competes in 2012 in the CAF Champions League. The club has the largest budget of a Cameroonian club (500 million CFA francs).

It has won sixteen Cameroon championships and six Cameroon cups. In addition, in continental competitions, the club reached the final of the CAF Cup in 2003 and the CAF Champions League in 2008 and the semi-finals of the same competition in 2013.

History
The club was founded in 1986 and campaigning in the lower leagues until they were promoted to the country's Premier League in 1992. Since 1996 Coton Sport has dominated local football winning eleven league titles in the process. In 2008 the club finished runners up in the CAF Champions League, losing to Al Ahly SC of Egypt in the final.

Honours

National titles
Elite 1:
Champions (17): 1997, 1998, 2001, 2003, 2004, 2005, 2006, 2007, 2008, 2010, 2011, 2013, 2014, 2015, 2018, 2021, 2022
Runners-up (6): 1994, 1996, 1999, 2000, 2002, 2019

Cameroonian Cup:
Winners (7): 2003, 2004, 2007, 2008, 2011, 2014, 2022
Runners-up: 1999

International titles
CAF Champions League:
Runners-up: 2008
CAF Cup:
Runners-up: 2003

Current squad
As of 16 March 2023.

Notable former coaches

 Jules Nyongha
 Bonaventure Djonkep (2002–03)
 Lamine Ndiaye (2003–06)
 Denis Lavagne (2007–08)
 Alain Ouombleon (2008–09)
 Denis Lavagne (2009–11)
 Robert Boivin (2012)
 Sébastien Desabre (2012–13)
 Didier Gomes Da Rosa (2014–15)
 Ali Hanteh (2022–)

References

External links

 
Football clubs in Cameroon
1986 establishments in Cameroon
Association football clubs established in 1986
Garoua